The 1997 NCAA Division I Women's Golf Championships were contested at the 16th annual NCAA-sanctioned golf tournament to determine the individual and team national champions of women's Division I collegiate golf in the United States.

The tournament was held at the Ohio State University Golf Club in Columbus, Ohio.

Arizona State won the team championship, the Sun Devils' fifth title and fourth in five years.

Heather Bowie, from Texas, won the individual title.

Individual results

Individual champion
 Heather Bowie, Texas (285, −3)

Team leaderboard

 † = Won tie-breaker
 DC = Defending champion
 Debut appearance

References

NCAA Women's Golf Championship
Golf in Ohio
NCAA Women's Golf Championship
NCAA Women's Golf Championship
NCAA Women's Golf Championship